Akhilesh Jaiswal (born 19 March 1986) is an Indian film director and screenwriter.

Early life and background 
Akhilesh Jaiswal was born in Bhopal, Madhya Pradesh. He grew up in Bhopal, did his schooling from there and came to Mumbai in 2006 for graduation. He was pursuing Bachelor of Mass Media from Lala Lajpat Rai College of Commerce and Economics. Only a year later did he realize that he was ready to launch into his true calling filmmaking, and that graduation wasn't required for it. So, he dropped out after his first year of college and started making small-time Marathi ad films and worked backstage with some theater groups.

Career 
Jaiswal says he always wanted to be a film maker. He got his big break when he got the opportunity to co-write Anurag Kashyap's 'Gangs of Wasseypur'. He made his directorial debut with Mastram, which released on 9 May 2014.

Akhilesh directed Ballabhpur Ki Roopkatha a web-adaptation of Badal Sarkar's classic, by the same name.

He has also helmed the story and screenwriting of ‘Simple Murder’ a web series  which got released on 20 Nov 20

Filmography

Director 
 Mastram (2014)
 Ballabhpur Ki Roopkatha (web-adaptation of Badal Sarkar's classic) (2017)
 Bawri Chhori (2021)

Writer 
Gangs of Wasseypur - Part 1 (2012)
Gangs of Wasseypur - Part 2 (2012)
Mastram (2014)
Ugly (Additional writer) (2014)
 A simple murder (2020)

References

External links 
 

1986 births
Living people
Writers from Bhopal
Hindi-language film directors
Hindi screenwriters
Film directors from Madhya Pradesh
21st-century Indian film directors
Screenwriters from Madhya Pradesh